Lazlo Toth is the name of:

Laszlo Toth (1938–2012), Hungarian-born geologist who attacked Michelangelo's Pietà with a hammer in 1972
Lazlo Toth, pen name under which comedian Don Novello (born 1943) wrote a series of letters to public figures and corporations; the name is derived from that of the Pietà vandal
László Fejes Tóth (1915–2005), mathematician